Earl Adams Hastings (January 7, 1924 – May 5, 1996) was a politician from Alberta, Canada.

Hastings was born in Regina, Saskatchewan. He ran for the House of Commons of Canada twice for the Liberal Party of Canada in the 1962 federal election and the 1963 federal election in the Bow River district. He was easily defeated both times.

On February 24, 1966 he was appointed to the Senate of Canada on the advice of Lester B. Pearson and served until his death on May 5, 1996.

References

External links
PMO tribute to Earl Hastings
Earl Hastings fonds Glenbow Museum
Earl Hastings biography Glenbow Museum

1924 births
1996 deaths
20th-century Canadian politicians
Canadian senators from Alberta
Liberal Party of Canada senators
Politicians from Regina, Saskatchewan